Thomas Glen Joseph Wilson (born 24 June 1997) is an Australian former professional basketball player, turned Australian rules football player who plays for the Collingwood Football Club.

Early life 
Wilson was born in Melbourne, Victoria. As a junior, Wilson played basketball for the Sandringham Sabres and the Melbourne Tigers. He attended Caulfield Grammar School, and in 2012, he was a member of their Australian Schools Championship winning side. He also played cricket and Australian rules football as a junior. Wilson represented Victoria in the 2013 NAB AFL U16 Championship. Shortly after, Wilson was awarded a NAB AFL Level 1 scholarship.

AFL career

Collingwood (2019–)
On 3 May 2019, it was announced that Wilson had signed with Collingwood in the AFL on a three-year Category B rookie contract. He made his AFL debut on 15 May 2021 in Sydney against .

Statistics 
Updated to the end of the 2022 season.

|-
| 2021 ||  || 12
| 4 || 0 || 0 || 25 || 23 || 48 || 7 || 7 || 0.0 || 0.0 || 6.3 || 5.8 || 12.0 || 1.8 || 1.8
|-
| 2022 ||  || 12
| 3 || 2 || 0 || 15 || 8 || 23 || 5 || 2 || 0.7 || 0.0 || 5.0 || 2.7 || 7.7 || 1.7 || 0.7
|- class=sortbottom
! colspan=3 | Career
! 7 !! 2 !! 0 !! 40 !! 31 !! 71 !! 12 !! 9 !! 0.3 !! 0.0 !! 5.7 !! 4.4 !! 10.1 !! 1.7 !! 1.3
|}

College career

Basketball career

Early career 
Around the same time, Wilson was offered a scholarship to attend Basketball Australia's Centre of Excellence (COE) at the Australian Institute of Sport in Canberra. Wilson chose to forgo the NAB AFL Level 1 scholarship and accepted Basketball Australia's COE scholarship. Wilson played for Basketball Australia's COE in the South East Australian Basketball League (SEABL) in 2014 and 2015.

There were a number of US colleges looking at Wilson after he played well for Australia's under-17 side when they almost beat USA in the gold medal game at the 2014 FIBA Under-17 World Championship. In October 2015, he committed to SMU and coach Larry Brown.

During the 2015–16 NBL season, Wilson spent time with Melbourne United as a development player. In 2016, he played for the Frankston Blues in the SEABL alongside his brother Jack. In nine games for Frankston, he averaged 11.1 points per game.

College career 
In November 2015, Wilson signed with SMU. In June 2016, Wilson joined the Mustangs ahead of the 2016–17 season. However, a month later, Larry Brown resigned from his position, with Tim Jankovich taking over the head spot. In December 2016, Wilson decided to transfer from SMU. In 10 games for the 10–3 Mustangs, Wilson averaged 1.6 points, 1.0 rebounds, and 0.5 assists, in just 6.1 minutes per game.

In January 2017, Wilson committed to Boise State University. However, in February, he made the decision to turn professional, due to NCAA rules indicating that Wilson would have to sit out a year before taking the court for the Broncos.

Professional career 
In 2017, Wilson played for the Melbourne Tigers in the SEABL. In 17 games, he averaged 19.7 points, 5.6 rebounds and 2.4 assists per game.

On 10 August 2017, Wilson signed a three-year deal with Serbian club Partizan. After a contract dispute forced him out of Partizan, Wilson spent the second half of the 2017–18 NBL season on the Sydney Kings' training roster.

On 5 February 2018, Wilson re-committed to the Melbourne Tigers for the 2018 season. On 15 May 2018, he was named SEABL Player of the Week for Round 6. A week later, he was named SEABL Player of the Week for Round 7. On 10 June 2018, he was named Player of the Month for May. At the season's end, he was named the SEABL MVP alongside All-SEABL First Team and Australian Youth Player of the Year.

On 19 April 2018, Wilson signed a 'one plus one' deal with the Sydney Kings, with the club holding the option on a second year. He scored 10 points in 12 games during the 2018–19 NBL season. The Kings took up the second-year option on 29 March 2019, but on 8 April, he made the decision to cut ties with basketball and join the ranks of Australian rules football.

National team career 
Wilson debuted for Australia at the 2013 FIBA Oceania Under-16 Championship, averaging 5.3 points, 4.3 rebounds and 2.3 assists per game. In 2014, he competed at the FIBA Under-17 World Championship and the FIBA Oceania Under-18 Championship. At the FIBA Under-17 World Championship in Dubai, Wilson helped Australia reach the gold medal game, where they lost to the USA 99–92 despite a 23-point effort from Wilson. For the tournament, Wilson averaged 12.3 points, 6.6 rebounds and 1.7 assists per game. In 2015, at the FIBA Under-19 World Championship, he averaged 6.4 points, 4.4 rebounds and 2.8 assists per game. In March 2019, he made his debut for the Australian Boomers.

References

External links 

Tom Wilson at fiba.com
Tom Wilson at sportstg.com
Thomas Wilson at sportstg.com

1997 births
Living people
Australian expatriate basketball people in the United States
Australian men's basketball players
Australian rules footballers from Melbourne
Basketball players from Melbourne
Collingwood Football Club players
Point guards
SMU Mustangs men's basketball players
Sydney Kings players
Australian Institute of Sport basketball players